Elaeocarpus eumundi, commonly known as Eumundi quandong, or smooth-leaved quandong, is a species of flowering plant in the family Elaeocarpaceae and is endemic to north-eastern Australia. It is a mid-sized tree with egg-shaped to lance-shaped leaves, racemes of cream-coloured flowers and blue fruit. It grows in rainforest from the Cape York Peninsula in Queensland to north-eastern New South Wales.

Description 
The leaves sometimes have teeth on the edges, but mostly near the tip. The midvein on the upper surface is prominent and the leaves turn yellow rather than red, as they age.

Taxonomy
Elaeocarpus eumundi was first formally described in 1894 by Frederick Manson Bailey in Proceedings of the Royal Society of Queensland. Bailey noted that the specific epithet (eumundii) refers to the Eumundi district, because "as far as is present known, it would seem to be confined to that district".

Distribution and habitat
It is rare in New South Wales, occurring north from the Whian Whian State Conservation Area.

Uses

Use in horticulture
Eumundi quandong is well suited as an ornamental tree and attract nectar-feeding and seed-eating birds.

Use as food
The fruit is said to be juicy and sharply acid.

Gallery

References

  (other publication details, included in citation)

Oxalidales of Australia
Trees of Australia
eumundi
Flora of Queensland
Flora of New South Wales
Ornamental trees
Plants described in 1894
Taxa named by Frederick Manson Bailey